Coyote is a village  in Rio Arriba County, New Mexico, United States. Its population was 128 as of the 2010 census. Coyote has a post office with ZIP code 87012, a store, a gas station and a school. New Mexico State Road 96 passes through the community. Coyote was settled in 1862.  The village is part of a larger census-designated place which is named after it.

References

Census-designated places in New Mexico
Census-designated places in Rio Arriba County, New Mexico